Combat Shock is a 1986 exploitation war drama film written, produced, and directed by Buddy Giovinazzo and starring his brother Rick Giovinazzo in the lead role. The film was distributed by Troma Entertainment.

The plot of the film takes place in Staten Island, and follows an unemployed Vietnam veteran named Frankie Dunlan living in total poverty with his nagging wife and his baby (who is deformed due to Frankie having been exposed to Agent Orange that the US was spraying as a defoliant over Vietnam) and junkie friends. Unable to get a job and surrounded by the depravity of urban life and crime, he begins to lose his grip on sanity.
The film received mixed to negative reviews upon its release.

Plot
The film begins with stock footage scenes of the Vietnam War. An American soldier named Frankie is seen running alone through the jungle as his voice narrates. He explains that he "goes back there every night" right before he wakes up in bed with his wife in their squalid New York apartment. The distorted cries of his baby are heard, and his pregnant wife wakes up to tend to the boy. They argue over Frankie's unemployment and their son's health. The baby is a mutant, which Frankie assumes was a result of chemical weapons such as Agent Orange used during the war.

A junkie scores from the local kingpin, Paco. Frankie waits in line outside the unemployment office. The junkie desperately searches for a needle to shoot up with. Frankie kills time entertaining a child prostitute. The junkie resorts to dumping the drugs directly onto a wound he opens in his arm and passes out. A random woman comes upon him and steals his gun and ammunition, putting them in her purse.

There is no work for Frankie at the unemployment office. Unexplained arbitrary things happen, such as one social worker asking another if he's seen his Veg-O-Matic. Frankie's social worker spaces out during their meeting and says, "Life is hot, and because life is hot, I must take off my jacket." He then resumes the meeting, imploring Frankie to go back to school because he has no marketable skills. Frankie is desperate for work, having been unemployed for four months.

He calls his father to ask for money. His father thinks the call is a prank, since he believes his son died in Saigon. Frankie explains that he was reported killed 15 years ago but made it out alive and spent three years in an army hospital recuperating. He tells his father that his wife is pregnant again and they are being evicted, but his father claims that he is also broke and about to die from a heart condition.

Seemingly broken, Frankie comes across the woman who stole the junkie's gun and steals her purse, an out of character criminal act for him. She screams for help. Paco and his thugs chase Frankie. When they overcome him, they mercilessly beat him. The gun falls out of the bag during the pummeling. When Paco goes through the bag, he finds the bullets and realizes there must have been a gun in it. He turns around to see Frankie standing with the gun.

Frankie shoots all three men in a daze. He has been beaten to a pulp, and his voice-over explains that his father was right: he had died in Saigon. He explains that his company had come upon a village where everyone had killed themselves to avoid being raped and murdered by the US soldiers. He realizes that he must similarly 'save' his family, and he returns home.

His wife is horrified by his appearance and briefly tends to his wounds. He is catatonic and hallucinates in front of the TV. Eventually, he reloads the gun and prepares to kill himself, but another hallucination reminds him of his purpose for returning home. Frankie walks into the bedroom, tells his wife that he loves her, and then shoots her in the stomach. As she lies on the ground, he shoots her three more times, yelling at her to die. He shoots the baby once and then picks it up from the crib. He cradles it and walks into the kitchen with it.

Frankie lays the baby in the oven and turns it all the way to the cleaning setting. He then pours himself a glass of spoiled milk and drinks it before committing suicide via gun. The final shot shows a train passing by into the night.

Cast
 Rick Giovinazzo as Frankie Dunlan
 Veronica Stork as Cathy Dunlan
 Mitch Maglio as Paco, Gang leader
 Asaph Livni as Labo, Gang member
 Leo Lunney as Frankie's father
 Nick Nasta as Morb, Gang member

Release

Critical response

Combat Shock was released to mixed to negative reviews, with many treating the film with extreme skepticism over its purported depictions of posttraumatic stress disorder and the Vietnam War.

Writing for The New York Times, Vincent Canby dismissed the film as a 'family affair', which "means to be shocking but it more often prompts giggles. You don't often see movies as passionately, sincerely misguided as this." Dennis Schwartz from Ozus' World Movie Reviews rated the film a grade C+, writing, "Director Buddy Giovinazzo pours on his misgivings about this bad war, and offers his unbridled pretensions of it. But this downer drama... might be too much horror for the viewer to take without any light moments. Nevertheless it offers fine editing and FX work." TV Guide gave the film a negative review, calling it "An intensely downbeat film, although one with some obviously serious (if unsuccessfully realized) pretensions."

Kurt Dahlke from DVD Talk gave the film 4/5 stars, writing, "Filled to the brim with nerve-shredding nihilism, total despair, and a take no prisoners attitude - actually, it takes prisoners and tortures them before killing them - Combat Shock is one of the bleakest films you'll ever have the chance to see. It's so bleak it's almost laughable, but the pathos is too real, even with a mutant baby." Film Threat praised the film, which they referred to as an antitheses of films such as Platoon, and Apocalypse Now; writing, "Combat Shock is dismal and depressing, and in its nerve-wracking realism it makes zero excuses for the establishment and its indifference."

References

External links
 
 
 
 

1986 films
1986 drama films
1980s exploitation films
1980s war drama films
American exploitation films
American war drama films
Anti-war films
Anti-war films about the Vietnam War
Films directed by Buddy Giovinazzo
Films set in Staten Island
Post-traumatic stress disorder in fiction
Troma Entertainment films
Vietnam War films
1980s English-language films
1980s American films